The 2006 Air New Zealand Screen Awards were held on Thursday 24 August 2006 at SkyCity Theatre in Auckland, New Zealand. Previously known as the New Zealand Screen Awards, the awards were renamed when airline Air New Zealand became the naming-rights sponsor, signing for five years of sponsorship.

The film awards had only four titles in the feature films category: The World's Fastest Indian, No.2, River Queen and Sione's Wedding, with The World's Fastest Indian winning seven of its 10 categories. Hollywood actors Anthony Hopkins and Ruby Dee won the Best Actor and Best Actress awards.

Nominees and winners

There were 13 feature film categories (an increase of one on 2005), two digital feature categories, four short film categories and 28 television categories (an increase of six on 2005).

Feature film 

Best Picture 
 The World's Fastest Indian, Gary Hannam, Roger Donaldson No.2, Tim White, Philippa Campbell, Lydia Livingstone
 River Queen, Don Reynolds, Chris Auty
 Sione's Wedding, John Barnett, Chloe SmithAchievement in Directing Roger Donaldson, The World's Fastest Indian
 Toa Fraser, No.2
 Chris Graham, Sione's Wedding

Screenplay 
 Roger Donaldson, The World's Fastest Indian
 Toa Fraser, No.2
 James Griffin, Oscar Kightley, Sione's Wedding

Performance by an Actor in a Leading Role
 Anthony Hopkins, The World's Fastest Indian
 Cliff Curtis, River Queen
 Shimpal Lelisi, Sione's Wedding

Performance by an Actress in a Leading Role
 Ruby Dee, No.2
 Teuila Blakely, Sione's Wedding
 Samantha Morton, River Queen

Performance by an Actor in a Supporting Role
 Rene Naufahu, No.2
 Xavier Horan, No.2
 Rawiri Pene, River Queen

Performance by an Actress in a Supporting Role
 Mia Blake, No.2
 Miriama McDowell, No.2
 Madeleine Sami, Sione's Wedding

Achievement in Cinematography
 Alun Bollinger, River Queen
 David Gribble ACS, The World's Fastest Indian
 Leon Narbey, No.2

Achievement in Editing
 John Gilbert ACE, The World's Fastest Indian
 Paul Maxwell, Sione's Wedding
 Chris Plummer, No.2

Achievement in Original Music 
 Don McGlashan, No.2
 J. Peter Robinson, The World's Fastest Indian

Contribution to a Soundtrack 
 Tim Prebble, Gethin Creagh, Michael Hedges, The World's Fastest Indian
 Tony Johnson, Sione's Wedding
 Tim Prebble, Mike Hedges, Dave Madigan, No.2

Achievement in Production Design 
 J. Dennis Washington, Rob Gillies, The World's Fastest Indian
 Iain Aitken, Sione's Wedding
 Rick Kofoed, River Queen

Achievement in Costume Design
 Barbara Darragh, River Queen
 Nancy Cavallaro, Jane Holland, The World's Fastest Indian
 Jane Holland, Sione's Wedding

Digital Feature 

Best Digital Feature 
 {Dream} Preserved, Stephen Kang Banana in a Nutshell, Roseanne Liang
 Squeegee Bandit, Rhonda Kite, Sandor LauTechnical Contribution to a Digital Feature 
 Sandor Lau, Squeegee Bandit
 Tim McLachlan, Hidden
 Derek Pearson, EVENT 16

Short film 

Best Short Film 
 Nature's Way, Jane Shearer Blue Willow, Veialu Aila-Unsworth
 Us, James BlickPerformance in a Short Film 
 Alison Bruce, Us
 Anna Hutchison, The Lost One
 Matthew Sunderland, Nature's Way

Script for a Short Film 
 Paolo Rotondo, Dead Letters
 Veialu Aila-Unsworth, Blue Willow
 James Blick, Us

Technical Contribution to a Short Film 
 Andrew Commis, Nature's Way
 Grant Major, Dead Letters
 Tom Reilly, The Ambassador's Brain

Television 

Best Drama Programme 
 Outrageous Fortune (ep 4), Mike Smith (South Pacific Pictures) 'The Insider's Guide To Love' (ep 2), Dave Gibson, Donna Malane, Chris Tyson (The Gibson Group)
 The Market  (ep1), Rachel Jean (Isola Productions Ltd)Best Drama Series 
 Outrageous Fortune, Mike Smith (South Pacific Pictures) The Insider's Guide To Love, Dave Gibson, Donna Malane, Chris Tyson (The Gibson Group)
 The Market, Rachel Jean (Isola Productions Ltd)Best Comedy Programme 
 bro'Town, Elizabeth Mitchell (Firehorse Films) Facelift – series 3, Chris Ellis, Dave Gibson (The Gibson Group)
 Seven Periods with Mr Gormsby, Tom Scott, Danny Mulheron (Direct Hit)Best Documentary 
 The Promise, Leanne Pooley (Spacific Films) Black Grace, From Cannon's Creek to Jacob's Pillow, Aileen O'Sullivan, Toby Mills (Seannachie/Tawera Productions)
 Lifting of the Makutu, Peta Carey (Watershed Films)Best Documentary / Factual Series 
 High Times, Rachel Jean (Isola Productions Ltd) Off The Rails – A Love Story, Melanie Rakena, Marcus Lush (Jam TV)
 Wicked Weather, John Hyde (NHNZ)Best Mäori Language Programme Koi, Chris Winitana (Awekura Productions) Moteatea, Hinewehi Mohi, Fran Davey (Raukatauri Productions)
 Pukana, Matai Smith (Cinco Cine Film Productions)Best Children's Programme 
 Holly's Heroes, Dave Gibson (The Gibson Group), Ann Darrouzet, Jenni Tosi (Tosi Westside) QTV, "Project Q", Glenis Giles (Oliver Giles Productions)
 Smokefreerockquest 2005, Pamela Cain, Lorraine Barry (Screentime Ltd)Best Lifestyle/Entertainment Programme 
 Dancing With the Stars, Debra Kelleher (TVNZ) Game of Two-Halves, Carlena Smith (Eyeworks Touchdown)
 The Living Room, series 3, Mark Albiston, Amelia Bardsley (Sticky Pictures)Best Event Broadcast Westfield Style Pasifika 2005, Stan Wolfgramm, Julie Smith (Drum Productions) National Mäori Sports Awards 2005, Bailey Mackey, Brendon Butt (Mäori Television)
 Shihad Live Aotea Square, Hayley Cunningham (Visionary Film & Television)Best Reality Series Border Patrol "Busted at the Border", Nigel Snowden (Cream TV) Miss Popularity, Greg Heathcote, Julie Christie (Eyeworks Touchdown)
 The Big Experiment, Charlotte Purdy, Sam Blackley, Jill Graham (Rogue Productions)Performance by an Actress Kate Elliott, The Insider's Guide To Love
 Luanne Gordon, Interrogation
 Cherie James, The Market

Performance by a Supporting Actress
 Claire Chitham, Interrogation
 Anapela Polataivao, The Market
 Antonia Prebble, Outrageous Fortune

Performance by an Actor 
 Gareth Reeves, The Insider's Guide To Love
 Xavier Horan, The Market
 Antony Starr, Outrageous Fortune

Performance by a Supporting Actor 
 Pete Smith, The Market 
 Nick Dunbar, The Insider's Guide To Love
 Joel Tobeck, Interrogation

Presenter Entertainment/Factual 
 Marcus Lush, Off the Rails – A Love Story
 Tamati Coffey, What Now (Whitebait TV)
 Temuera Morrison, The Tem Show (Greenstone Pictures)

Script, Single Episode of a Drama Series or Serial
 Fiona Samuel, Interrogation, "Girl in Woods"
 Paula Boock, The Insider's Guide To Love, episode 6
 Rachel Lang & James Griffin, Outrageous Fortune, episode 13

Script, Comedy 
 Oscar Kightley, Mario Gaoa, David Fane, Shimpal Lelisi, Elizabeth Mitchell, bro'Town, "Touched by a Teacher"
 Dave Armstrong, Danny Mulheron, Tom Scott, Seven Periods with Mr Gormsby, episode 3
 Peter Cox, The Pretender, episode 1

Achievement in Directing, Drama/Comedy Programme 
 Nathan Price, The Insider's Guide To Love
 Mark Beesley, Outrageous Fortune
 Murray Keane, Interrogation

Achievement in Directing, Documentary
 Peta Carey, Lifting of the Makutu
 Leanne Pooley, The Promise
 Gaylene Preston, Earthquake

Achievement in Directing, Factual/Entertainment/Reality
 Mark Albiston, The Living Room, series 3
 Jane Andrews, Intrepid Journeys "Cuba With Kim Hill"
 Melanie Rakena, Off the Rails – A Love Story

Achievement in Camerawork, Drama 
 Simon Baumfield, The Insider's Guide To Love
 Grant McKinnon, The Market
 David Paul, The Insider's Guide To Love

Achievement in Camerawork, Documentary 
 Wayne Vinten, The Promise
 Renaud Maire, Lifting of the Makutu
 Michael O'Connor, Black Grace – From Cannon's Creek to Jacob's Pillow

Achievement in Editing, Drama
 Lisa Hough, Interrogation
 Nicola Smith, Outrageous Fortune
 Paul Sutorius, The Insider's Guide To Love

Achievement in Editing, Documentary
 Ken Sparks, Black Grace – From Cannon's Creek to Jacob's Pillow
 Mark Taylor, High Times
 Tim Woodhouse, The Promise

Achievement in Original Music 
 David Long, The Insider's Guide To Love
 Jonathan Besser, Whirimako Black, Oliver Mtukudzi, Lands of Our Fathers – My African Legacy
 Plan 9: David Donaldson, Stephen Roche, Janet Roddick, Earthquake

Contribution to a Soundtrack 
 Melanie Graham, Polly McKinnon, Mike Hedges, Earthquake
 Steve Finnigan, Tom Miskin, Outrageous Fortune
 Ian Leslie, Chris Todd, Ray Beentjes, Frontier of Dreams

Achievement in Production Design
 Ant Sang, bro'Town
 Clayton Ercolano, Outrageous Fortune
 Brett Schwieters, Interrogation

Contribution to Design
 Nic Smillie, The Insider's Guide To Love
 Karl Butler, The Survivor Files
 Alex Kennedy (Kennedy Model Making), Facelift, series 3

References

New Zealand film awards
Screen Awards
New Zealand
Air New Zealand
August 2006 events in New Zealand